My Kingdom is a 2001 British crime film directed by Don Boyd and starring Richard Harris, Lynn Redgrave and Jimi Mistry.

It premiered at the 2001 Toronto International Film Festival on the eve of 9/11 and like many films that year was consequently compromised commercially. It was subsequently  previewed in Los Angeles to heighten nomination opportunities for the performance of Richard Harris later that year and was well reviewed by the Los Angeles Times and Variety.

The film, co-scripted by Boyd with The Guardian journalist Nick Davies and drawing on both their researches into the London and Liverpool criminal underworld (which in Boyd's case included the Kray brothers), brought Boyd into conflict with its principal lead Richard Harris, who wanted to rewrite the script. The film was released in the United Kingdom by Tartan Films receiving mixed reviews while generally acknowledging a fine performance from Harris who was nominated for a British Independent Film Award.
Harris acknowledged his approval for the final film at a valedictory event held at the Cambridge Film Festival months before his death.

Cast
 Richard Harris as "Sandeman"
 Reece Noi as The Boy
 Lynn Redgrave as Mandy
 Tom Bell as "Quick"
 Emma Catherwood as Jo
 Aidan Gillen as Puttnam
 Louise Lombard as Kath
 Paul McGann as Dean
 Jimi Mistry as "Jug"
 Lorraine Pilkington as Tracy
 Colin Salmon as "The Chair"
 James Foy as "Animal"
 James McMartin as "Mineral"
 Danny Lawrence as "Tigger"
 Gerard Starkey as Minder
 Sasha Johnson Manning as Soprano
 Seamus O'Neill as "Snowy"
 Chris Armstrong as Dutch Farmer
 Ingi Thor Jonsson as Dutch Farmer
 Otis Graham as Delroy
 David Yip as "Merv"
 Kieran O'Brien as The Photographer
 Jack Marsden as Billy "The Whizz"
 Amer Nazir as "Mutt"
 Mushi Noor as Jeff
 Carl Learmond as Rudi
 Anthony Dorrs as "Skunk"
 Steve Foster as "Toffee"
 Oscar James as Desmond
 Sylvia Gatril as The Brothel Receptionist
 Sharon Byatt as Annie
 Desmond Bayliss as John "The Dog"
 Kelly Murphy as Karen
 Leanne Burrows as Miss Joy

References

External links

2001 films
2000s crime films
2000s English-language films
Films directed by Don Boyd
Modern adaptations of works by William Shakespeare
Films based on King Lear
British crime films
2000s British films